In military terms, 15th Division or 15th Infantry Division may refer to:

Infantry divisions
 15th Infantry Division (Belgium)
 15th Infantry Division (France)
 15th Motorized Infantry Division (France)
 15th Division (German Empire), a unit of the Prussian/German Army, later 15th Infantry Division
 15th Landwehr Division (German Empire)
 15th Reserve Division (German Empire), a unit of the Imperial German Army in World War I
 15th Infantry Division (Wehrmacht), formed on 1 October 1934 in Würzburg under the cover name Artillerieführer V
 15th Panzergrenadier Division (Wehrmacht)
 15th Infantry Division (Greece), (Greek: XV Μεραρχία Πεζικού (XV ΜΠ); XV Merarchía Pezikoú), an infantry division of the Hellenic Army
 15th Waffen Grenadier Division of the SS (1st Latvian), an Infantry Division of the Waffen SS during World War II
 15th Division (Imperial Japanese Army), an infantry division in the Imperial Japanese Army
 15th Infantry Division (India), British Indian Army during World War I
 15th Infantry Division (Iraq)
 15th Infantry Division Bergamo (Italy)
 15th Division (North Korea), a military formation of the Korean People's Army during the 20th Century
 15th Infantry Division (Philippines)
 15th Infantry Division (Poland), a unit of the Polish Army in the interbellum period
 15th Infantry Division (Thailand)
 15th (Scottish) Division, an infantry division of the British Army that fought in the First World War
 15th (Scottish) Infantry Division, an infantry division of the British Army that fought in the Second World War
 15th Infantry Division (United States)
 15th Rifle Division (Soviet Union), a military formation of the Red Army active during the Russian Civil War and World War II
 15th Special Forces Division, Syria

Cavalry divisions
15th Cavalry Division (Russian Empire)
15th Cavalry Division (United States), created in 1917 at Fort Sam Houston, Texas

Armored divisions 
 15th Panzer Division (Wehrmacht)

Aviation divisions
15th Fighter Aviation Division (People's Liberation Army Air Force)

Air defense divisions
 15th Air Defense Division (Yugoslavia)